was a Japanese essayist.

Life
A second cousin of the Shōwa Emperor, Irie was born in Tokyo. He was a graduate of the University of Tokyo. He was Grand Chamberlain of Japan (1969–1985). He was a recipient of the Order of the Rising Sun and the Order of the Sacred Treasure.

Ancestry

Bibliography
 『入江相政日記』（朝日新聞社全6巻、1990年 - 1991年、朝日文庫全12巻、1994年 - 1995年）

External links

 名士録 入江相政

1905 births
1985 deaths
Grand Cordons of the Order of the Rising Sun
Recipients of the Order of the Sacred Treasure, 1st class
University of Tokyo alumni
Japanese essayists
People from Tokyo
20th-century essayists
Japanese diarists
20th-century diarists